Vyacheslav Aleksandrovich Ovchinnikov (29 May 1936 in Voronezh, Soviet Union – 4 February 2019 in Moscow, Russia) was a Soviet and Russian composer.

Biography 
He began composing at age 9 and entered the Moscow Conservatory at 15. Later he studied with Tikhon Khrennikov and Leo Ginzburg. He composed symphonies, symphonic poems, as well as works for chamber orchestra, small ensembles and solo instruments.

Outside his native country he is best known as a composer of music for such films as War and Peace, the 1966–67 film directed by Sergei Bondarchuk, Ivan's Childhood and Andrei Rublev for Andrei Tarkovsky. He has composed for some 40 films in total. Tarkovsky is said to have been so impressed by Ovchinnikov that he stated: "I cannot imagine a better composer for myself than Vyacheslav Ovchinnikov."

Ovchinnikov also had a successful career as a touring conductor from the 1970s. He has recorded for Melodiya, the Russian record company. His Symphony No. 2 was released on the Melodiya label.

Ovchinnikov was named a People's Artist of the RSFSR in 1986. For the 60th birthday (1992) of Queen Sirikit of Thailand, he was commissioned to compose The Bouquet for the Queen. For that work he was awarded the Order of the White Elephant. He was also a professor at the University of Kansas from 1990 to 1991.

Compositions

Orchestral 

 1955-57: Symphony No. 1
 1955-57:  Six Symphonic Suites (for full orchestra)
 1956: Symphony No. 2, Yuri Gagarin (symphonic poem, dedicated to Yuri Gagarin, rev. 1972–73)
 1964: Symphony No. 3 
 1986: Symphony No. 4 for Chorus and Orchestra
 1991: Symphony No. 5

Opera 

 1974-78: On the Dawn of the Misty Youth

Ballet 

 1962: Sulamith
 1988: Song of Songs
 Song of Spring Thaw
 Dedication (One act, collaboration with V.Kicta [?])

For piano 

 Suite No. 1 (for piano)
 Suite No. 2 (for piano, four hands)

Choral music 

 2015: Elegy in Memory of Rachmaninoff, for Soprano, Chorus, and Orchestra (Written for the 100th Anniversary of Sergei Rachmaninoff Concert)
There is Sky Lighted Edge, for a-capella Chorus (words by A. Block)
Vocaliz, for a-capella Chorus
Little Ballade, for a-capella Chorus (words by R. Burns)
Singing for You, for a-capella Chorus
Be Famed, Native Land, for Chorus and Orchestra (words by L.Vasilieva)
Wind brought from Afar, for a-capella Chorus (words by A. Block)
Autumnal, for Chorus (words by V.Firsov)

Cantata 

 Song-Ballade about BAM Builders, for Orchestra, Symphony, and Bass soloist (words by L. Vasilieva)

Oratorio 

 Seasons, for Orchestra, Symphony, and SATB soloists (folk lyrics arranged by V.Firsov)
 Sergei Radonezhsky, for Orchestra, Symphony, AB soloists (folk lyrics)

Accompaniment Music 

 1973: Scene of Action -- Russia (in collaboration with D.Gendelev)
 2001 (play by S. MIkhailov, premiered at The A. Bryantsev Youth Theater)
 Full Turn Around (based on William Faulkner's analogous story, directed by A. Tarkovsky)

Arrangements 

 Select Arrangements of Rachmaninoff's Choral Works

Filmography 

 The Steamroller and the Violin (1960)
 The Boy and the Dove (1961)
 Ivan's Childhood (1962)
 The First Teacher (1965)
 War and Peace (1966–1967)
 Andrei Rublev (1966)
 A Long Happy Life (1966)
 A Nest of Gentry (1969)
 A Soldier Came Back from the Front (1971)
 Arsenal (1972 restored version)
 That Sweet Word: Liberty! (1972)
 Earth (1972 restored version)
 Zvenigora (1973 restored version)
 They Fought for Their Country (1975)
 The Steppe (1977)
 Boris Godunov (1986)

References

External links
Official Website of Vyacheslav Ovchinnikov (in English)
Bio at Onno van Rijen's Soviet Composer's Page

Tribute at Harvard Film Archive

1936 births
2019 deaths
20th-century Russian male musicians
Male film score composers
Moscow Conservatory alumni
People's Artists of the RSFSR
Recipients of the Lenin Komsomol Prize
Recipients of the Order "For Merit to the Fatherland", 4th class
Recipients of the Order of the Red Banner of Labour
Russian composers
Russian film score composers
Russian male composers
Soviet film score composers
Soviet male composers
People from Voronezh